The Armed Forces Classic is a college basketball event operated on a military boatcraft, televised on ESPN, that involves one or two games played in front of military members and their families.

History
The first game was held on November 9, 2012, between Michigan State and UConn at the Ramstein Air Base in Germany.  It was the first college basketball game played between two NCAA Division I teams in Europe.

The 2016 edition broke new ground for the event in several respects. It was the first to feature two games, and also the first not to be played at a military base, with games held at Stan Sheriff Center on the campus of the University of Hawaii at Mānoa in Honolulu. Additionally, it was the first time tickets were sold to the general public, although all seats in the arena's lower bowl were reserved for military personnel and their families. The event was held in Honolulu to commemorate the 75th anniversary of the attack on Pearl Harbor; surrounding events were held at Joint Base Pearl Harbor–Hickam.

The game was cancelled in 2020 and 2021 due to the COVID-19 pandemic.

Games
Sites for future games are tentative and may change due to military circumstances.

Notes

References

External links
 Official Site

College men's basketball competitions in the United States
College basketball competitions
Recurring sporting events established in 2012
ESPN